The 2016 US Open 9-Ball Championships 2016 was an international pool tournament in the discipline 9-Ball, from 16 to 22 October 2016 at Sheraton Norfolk Waterside Hotel in Norfolk, Virginia, United States. It was the 41st entry of the U.S. Open 9-Ball Championships. The American Shane Van Boening won the event with a 13–9 final victory against the Taiwanese Chang Jung-Lin to win his fifth US Open. van Boening's fifth title put him equal for the most wins with Earl Strickland. Third place went to Jayson Shaw .

Defending champion was the Kevin Cheng. However, after defeats against Hsieh Chia-chen and Antonio Lining, Cheng lost in the double elimination round without a win.

Tournament format

Rankings
The following were the 32 best placed players.

References

External links
 official Website

 US Open 9-Ball Championships 2016 at sixpockets.de

Sports in Norfolk, Virginia
U.S. Open
U.S. Open
U.S Open 9-Ball championship